City of Dream: Stories is an anthology of short stories by Pranaya SJB Rana. It was published in 2015 by Rupa Publications. It is the first book by Rana, who is a Nepalese journalist and writer.

Synopsis 
The stories are set in and around Kathmandu city. The stories included in the anthology are:
 City of Dreams
 The Smoker
 Dashain
 Our Ruin
 Two
 Maya
 Knife in the Water
 The Red Kurta 
 The Presence of God
 The Child

Reception 
The collection was favorably reviewed in Nepal with one review calling Rana "a bold writer, willing to push against the boundaries of what we might have come to expect of South Asian writers".

See also 

 The Tutor of History
 The Wayward Daughter 
 Arresting God in Kathmandu

References 

21st-century Nepalese books
2015 short story collections
English books by Nepalese writer
Nepalese short story collections
Nepalese literature in English